The Seymour tall case clock in the White House, more commonly known as the Oval Office grandfather clock, is an  longcase clock, made between 1795 and 1805 in Boston by John and Thomas Seymour, and has been located in the Oval Office since 1975. Since the presidency of Gerald Ford it has remained one of the few constant features in the office, throughout several renovations.

Features

Made of mahogany, it features "crotch birch and satinwood veneers", a "double lunette inlay", and a movement likely made by James Doull of Charlestown, Massachusetts.  According to a memo prepared for First Lady Betty Ford in 1975, the previous First Lady Patricia Nixon "... was partially gifted (and partially purchased) the 'wonderful collection of very beautiful and rather feminine American furniture' by the Seymours from Boston's Vernon Stoneman in 1972." Since installation in the Oval Office, it has been at the room's northeast corner (between the visiting guests' door from the Personal Secretary's office and the portal to the West Colonnade). Immigrants from England, the Seymours (father and son) are considered master cabinetmakers in the federal style. They perfected their craft in New England during "one of the most pivotal chapters in American history" to create "truly iconic pieces of American furniture". Its commercial value has been estimated at $100,000. An almost identical Seymour clock of the same period and materials is in the collection of the Metropolitan Museum of Art.

Historical appearances 
Prior to the Seymour clock, another had preceded it in the Oval Office's northeast corner during the Lyndon B. Johnson and early Richard Nixon administrations, from 1965 – 1969. All 85 clocks in the White House (including the 12 longcase clocks), were maintained and wound by John Muffler the White House's chief electrician and longest-serving employee. The chimes on all White House clocks have all been disabled since an order by Harry S. Truman, due to the difficulty of keeping them all synchronized.

Jimmy Carter said that, during the last stages of the Iran hostage crisis negotiations when he spent forty-eight hours continuously in the Oval Office, "No matter who was with me, we watched the big grandfather clock by the door."

Due to its location, the clock has appeared in the background of many official photographs of successive American presidents receiving world leaders in the Oval Office, and during meetings:

Comey testimony

The clock was mentioned specifically by the former FBI director James Comey, in his written statement to Congress, published the day before his testimony to the Senate Select Committee on Intelligence regarding his being dismissed by President Donald Trump. This very specific and repeated mention of the clock raised increased interest in the clock's own history and caused a minor sensation on social media.

See also

 Resolute desk

References

External links

 Treasures of the White House: Seymour tall case clock – White House Historical Association

Clocks in the United States
Furnishings of the White House
Longcase clocks
Individual clocks